The Ministry of the Environment is responsible for the administration and regulation of the environment in Tunisia. Established in 1991, it has its headquarters at Centre urbain nord 1082 in Tunis. the current minister is Leila Chikhaoui.

References

External links
Official site 

Government ministries of Tunisia
Environment ministries
Ministries established in 1991
1991 establishments in Tunisia